The Stolen Kiss is a 1920 American silent romance drama film starring Constance Binney. Kenneth Webb directed. The Realart Company, an affiliate of Paramount Pictures, produced the film. A print is preserved at the British Film Institute, London.

Plot
As described in a film magazine, very natural and impulsive Felicia Day (Binney), kept by a watchful governess and vigilant grandfather within walls that surround her home, makes the acquaintance of but one boy, Dudley Hamilt (La Rocque), who sings in the choir of the church next door. Years pass and he returns as a young man, again to meet Felicia over the garden wall, at which time they kiss impulsively only to be separated by her grandparent. Years pass and her grandparent dies, so she returns as an old fashioned maiden to the city. Forced to make her living by sewing, she has many adventures but is always trying to locate her ideal, Dudley. He, meanwhile, searches for her with equal ardor. The film concludes with their meeting and the pledging of their troth.

Cast
Constance Binney as Felicia Day / Octavia, her Mother
Rod La Rocque as Dudley Hamilt
George Backus as Maj. Trenton
Bradley Barker as John Ralph
Robert Schable as Allen Graemer
Frank Losee as Peter Alden
Richard Carlyle as James Burrell
Edyna Davies as Dulcie
Ada Neville as Mlle. D'Ormy (credited as Ada Nevil)
Agnes Everett as Marthy
Eddie Fetherston as Jack Hall
Jean Lamb as Mrs. Hall
Joseph Latham as Tom Stone

References

External links

allmovie/synopsis; The Stolen kiss
Still from set (University of Washington, Sayre Collection)

1920 films
American silent feature films
Films directed by Kenneth Webb
Films based on American novels
American romantic drama films
1920 romantic drama films
American black-and-white films
1920s American films
Silent romantic drama films
Silent American drama films